A number of steamships have been named Cape Girardeau, including:

Ship names